Sosyo is an Indian aerated drink, produced and marketed mainly in the western and northern states of India; Gujarat, Maharashtra, Rajasthan Uttar Pradesh and Madhya Pradesh. It is based in Surat.

Sosyo is the product of the Swadeshi movement of Indian independence struggle. Mohsin Hajoori introduced Sosyo in 1927 in Surat, as an Indian option to the UK drink Vimto. Vimto was marketed in India since 1923 by Mohsin Hajoori.

Originally, Sosyo was called Socio, The present name was derived from the Latin word 'Socious', since it became a social drink. 
Sosyo is a mixture of grape and apple cider with some ingredients imported from Germany and Italy.

50 million bottles of Sosyo are consumed every year, mainly in Surat and parts of Gujarat and Maharashtra where bottling plants are located. It is exported as far as UAE, South Africa, New Zealand, UK and USA. The exported bottles are marked as ‘An Indian Drink’ with a tri-coloured backdrop.

References

External links
 Official Website
 Article on Business Today: Sosyo wants to be a national brand when it grows up

Indian drinks
Gujarati cuisine
Economy of Surat